Results of Tour de Corse (51ème Tour de Corse - Rallye de France), 13th round of 2007 World Rally Championship, run on October 12–14. Citroën's Sébastien Loeb won the race, his 35th win in the World Rally Championship. The rally was the first for the Suzuki World Rally Team's to make its debut in the SX4 WRC car.

Results

Retirements
  Aigar Pärs - went off the road (OS6);
  Gilles Schammel - mechanical (OS6);
  Urmo Aava - went off the road (OS8);
  François Duval - mechanical (OS12);
  Andreas Mikkelsen - excluded (OS12);
  Matthew Wilson - mechanical (OS15);

Special Stages 
All dates and times are CEST (UTC+2).

Championship standings after the event

Drivers' championship

Manufacturers' championship

External links 
 Results on the official site: WRC.com
 Results on eWRC-results.com
 Results at Jonkka's World Rally Archive

Corse, Tour de
2007
Corse, Tour de
October 2007 sports events in France